Noble Cause Foundation commonly abbreviated as NCF is a non-profit organisation in India that aims to provide health care, education and rural infrastructure in India. The organisation was established in 2014. The organisation partners with other Non-governmental organisations to uplift thousands of Indian Women and Children who are denied basic rights. It works towards restoring basic rights to Women and Children, especially from India and works across levels from direct action to advocacy, mobilising public opinion and policy change.

It was started by Gururaj and Ashwath in 2014. The organisation is now growing, and by the end of 2018 the organisation has plans to expand working in few other states for their upcoming projects in rural, semi-urban and urban areas.

Noble Cause Foundation has set up a two-tier network of over 75 primary and 125 secondary volunteers spread across 27 districts of Karnataka and interacts with over 2500 older persons on monthly basis through its volunteers’ network.

It focuses mainly on the 4 basic rights of survival, development, protection and participation which were defined by the United Nations Convention on the Rights of the Child (CRC), international human rights treaty which has been ratified by 192 countries and 4 out of the 7 basic principles defined by UN WOMEN, a United Nations Entity for Gender Equality and the Empowerment of Women

Basic principles(Children's Rights)
The CRC is built on certain "foundation principles" that underpin all other children's rights. The NCRC confers the following basic rights on all children across the world, without discrimination:

the right to survival, to life, health, nutrition, name and nationality,
the right to development of education, care, leisure, and recreation,
the right to protection from exploitation, abuse and neglect,
the right to participation in expression, information, thought and religion.

NCF works to ensure these rights to all categories of children, who could be street children, children bonded in labor, children of commercial sex workers, physically and mentally challenged children and children in juvenile institutions, or even children in privileged homes.

Basic principles(Women Empowerment)
Ensure the health, safety and well-being of all women workers,
Promote education, training and professional development for women,
Implement enterprise development, supply chain and marketing practices that empower women,
Promote equality through community initiatives and advocacy.

History
In 2014, seven friends made a simple decision to change the lives of India's underprivileged women & children. With USD 50 and a dining table as their resources and a belief that each one can make a difference in under privileged women's & children's life. This was how NCF began.

Registration under different statutes 
The Foundation is Registered with the Charity Commissioner/Sub Registrar as a Trust in Bengaluru.
The Foundation has applied for registration of its Logo and Trade Mark with the Trade Marks Registry.
The Foundation is registered under Income Tax Act under section 12AA and under section 80G. The donation made to it qualify for exemption under section 80G of income tax act.
Since its inception, NCF's financial statements are audited by a qualified Chartered Accountant.
All the events, activities and programs conducted by NCF are in compliance with all the relevant Acts, Rules & Regulations and after obtaining necessary permission and clearance from appropriate authorities in this behalf.

Mission

To identify and work alongside the economically and socially deprived, so that they become educated, skilled and aware.

Enable them to be self-reliant and enjoy a healthy, dignified and sustainable quality of life

To enable people to take responsibility for the situation of the deprived Indian child and so motivate them to confront the situation through collective action thereby giving the child and themselves an opportunity to realise their full potential.

To work in partnership with individuals and organisations, and support them financially / non-financially as well as with people from all walks of life, who believe in the rights of children. Within NCF too, each function works in unison towards ensuring the vision of equal rights for all children.

Vision

To enable people to take responsibility for the situation of the deprived Indian child and so motivate them to confront the situation through collective action thereby giving the child and themselves an opportunity to realise their full potential.

To work in partnership with individuals and organisations, and support them financially / non-financially as well as with people from all walks of life, who believe in the rights of children. Within NCF too, each function works in unison towards ensuring the vision of equal rights for all children.

Areas of work

The key functions of Development Support (grant making) and Resource Mobilisation (fundraising) along with the other support functions - Communications, Human Resources, Youth and Volunteer action, Finance, Planning and Information Technology, Documentation - all play a critical role in the organisation building efforts.

It works towards restoring basic rights to women and children, especially from India and works across levels from direct action to advocacy, mobilising public opinion and policy change. It focuses mainly on the four basic rights of survival, development, protection and participation which were defined by the United Nations Convention on the Rights of the Child.

The CRC is built on certain "foundation principles" that underpin all other children's rights.

NCF’s approach works through a three-phase engagement:

 First, NCF chooses to work in areas where the human development indicators are the worst in the country – seeking out the most marginalised communities and their children. It examines the situation of the children in these communities in a holistic manner, covering the entire gamut of issues that affect them.
NCF then seeks to understand the root causes of the deprivation faced by children in education. In India, the root causes that prevent children from accessing their rights often tend to be:
 i) gender- or caste-based discrimination in the home, the community or in school,
 ii) the lack of adequate livelihoods for the adults, forcing them to make their children work as child labourers, or
 iii) forced displacement that forces families to migrate, and also pushes children to drop out of school.
Finally, NCF mobilise the local community to find long-term solutions to these root causes by making sure that the laws and policies that guarantee their rights are actually implemented.
NCF started work on empowering under-privileged women & children and the communities they belonged to by actively partnering grassroots-level NGOs working in remote and neglected areas of India. These organisations are trained to mobilise rural and urban communities to access their entitlements through collective action.

The process of building the community-based collectives entail educating and informing the rural poor about their entitlements to education as given by the Government under the relevant Acts and Schemes; and enabling them to demand these entitlements from the local government.

References

External links
 Noble Cause Foundation,official website

Organizations established in 2014
Child-related organisations in India
Children's rights organizations
2014 establishments in Karnataka